Attorney General Lawrence may refer to:

Allan Lawrence (politician) (1925–2008), Attorney General of Ontario
James Lawrence (Ohio politician) (1851–1914), Attorney General of Ohio
Nathaniel Lawrence (1761–1797), Attorney General of New York

See also
Thomas St. Lawrence (judge) (died 1553), Attorney General for Ireland
Walter St. Lawrence (died 1504), Attorney General for Ireland